Lock Upp: Badass Jail, Atyaachari Khel! is an  Indian reality television series created by Ekta Kapoor and currently hosted by Kangana Ranaut, premiered on ALTBalaji and MX Player from 27 February 2022. The Grand Finale or Badass Finale of the show was held on 7 May 2022 where Munawar Faruqui emerged as the winner while Payal Rohatgi was announced as the Runner-up.

Overview
Ekta Kapoor teased the show on her social media handles. Kapoor described the show as the biggest and the most fearless reality show.

Concept
Contestants called Inmates who were accused in outside world fought it out in jail to earn every basic necessity and win the heart of the host and audience by performing tasks and showcasing their personalities. Karan Kundrra was introduced as Jailor for the entire season. Tejasswi Prakash entered as the Warden for the finale episode. In the end, the contestant with the highest votes walks away with freedom and the trophy of Lock Upp: Badass Jail, Atyaachari Khel!.

Series details

Contestants

Reception

Critical reception  
Namrata Thakker of Rediff.com gave the show two and a half stars out of five and observed, "Lock Upp looks and sounds like Bigg Boss, on the surface but it isn't" to find out more you'll have to watch the show!.

On 21st March 2022, The show crossed 100 million views in just 19 days.

See also
List of programs broadcast by ALTBalaji

References

External links
 Lock Upp: Badass Jail, Atyaachari Khel! on ALTBalaji
 
 Lock Upp: Badass Jail, Atyaachari Khel! on MX Player

Indian reality television series
2022 Indian television series debuts
Hindi-language television shows
Television shows set in Mumbai
ALTBalaji original programming